Gösta Horn (24 January 1907 – 10 December 1943) was a Swedish diver. He competed in the men's 10 metre platform event at the 1928 Summer Olympics. He was killed in action during World War II.

References

External links
 

1907 births
1943 deaths
Swedish male divers
Olympic divers of Sweden
Divers at the 1928 Summer Olympics
People from Eskilstuna
Military personnel killed in World War II
Sportspeople from Södermanland County
20th-century Swedish people